Gilels is a surname. Notable people with the surname include:

Elena Gilels (1948–1996), Russian pianist
Elizabeth Gilels (1919–2008), Soviet violinist and professor, brother of Emil
Emil Gilels (1916–1985), Soviet pianist
Zinaida Gilels (1924–2000), Soviet violinist and pedagogue